Cittaducale (locally ) is a comune (municipality) in the Province of Rieti in the Italian region Lazio, located about  northeast of Rome and about  southeast of Rieti. It was once part of the Abruzzi Region.

The municipality of Cittaducale contains the frazioni (subdivisions, mainly villages and hamlets) Santa Rufina, Grotti, Calcariola, Pendenza, Cesoni, and Micciani.

Cittaducale borders the following municipalities: Borgo Velino, Castel Sant'Angelo, Longone Sabino, Micigliano, Petrella Salto, Rieti.

Bishopric 

With territory taken from the diocese of Rieti, Pope Alexander VI made Cittaducale the seat of a new diocese on 24 January 1502, but in view of the objections raised by Cardinal Giovanni Colonna, who was administrator of the diocese of Rieti, Pope Julius II suppressed the new see on 8 November 1505. However, after the cardinal's death and at the request of the bishop of Rieti, the same pope restored the diocese on 16 October 1508.

The diocese continued as a residential see until the death of its bishop Pasquale Martini in 1798, after which it was entrusted to a vicar of the bishop of Rieti until Pope Pius VII united it on 27 June 1818 to the archdiocese of L'Aquila. Finally, in 1976 it became again part of the diocese of Rieti, as it had been originally.

No longer a residential bishopric, Cittaducale is today listed by the Catholic Church as a titular see.

Demographic evolution

Transport 
Cittaducale has a station on the Terni–Sulmona railway, with trains to Terni, Rieti and L'Aquila.

References

External links
 www.comunecittaducale.it/

Cities and towns in Lazio